Toonami Jetstream was an ad-supported online broadband streaming service and a remake of Toonami's previous video streaming service Toonami Reactor provided by Cartoon Network and Viz Media.

It hosted various Toonami hits and had music videos, game reviews, and a comment box. It premiered July 17, 2006. Toonami Jetstream was only available in the United States. A computer with Windows 2000 SP4+, Windows XP, Windows Vista or Mac OS X, Microsoft Internet Explorer 5.5 (or higher) or Mozilla Firefox 1.5 (or higher), Adobe Flash 9, and a broadband connection were required.

After Toonami was cancelled on September 20, 2008, it was unknown if Toonami Jetstream would still be active, or would merge with Cartoon Network Video. On January 30, 2009, however, Toonami Jetstream suddenly got taken offline. As a result, Naruto moved to Cartoon Network Video, while other anime series like Zatch Bell! and Hikaru no Go are on Viz Media's website and One Piece is available on Funimation's official One Piece website.

Shows

Former series (premieres)
  Blue Dragon  (debuted on Jetstream April 7, 2008, was on television at time of Jetstream's debut, was exclusively on Jetstream) (aired weekly) (TV-Y7-FV)
  Hikaru no Go (debuted on Jetstream July 14, 2006, with biweekly instruction "How to play Go" clips, now finished) (aired biweekly) (TV-PG)
 Kiba (debuted on Jetstream July 14, 2008) (aired biweekly) (TV-PG-V)
 Zatch Bell! (debuted on Jetstream March 12, 2007, on hiatus at time up to episode 77 of Jetstream debut, though that hiatus was ignored in this case) (aired weekly) (TV-Y7-FV)

Former series (reruns)
 MÄR (debuted on Jetstream July 14, 2006, debuted on television December 23, 2006) (aired biweekly) (TV-PG-V)
 Naruto (debuted on Jetstream July 14, 2006, was on television at time of Jetstream's launch, was exclusively on Jetstream.) (aired weekly) (TV-PG-V,S,D)
 Pokémon: Battle Frontier 1 (debuted on Jetstream November 17, 2008, formerly on television) (aired weekly) (TV-Y7-FV)
 Pokémon: Master Quest 1(debuted on Jetstream June 16, 2008, formerly on television) (aired weekly) (TV-Y7-FV)
 Samurai Jack (debuted on Jetstream July 14, 2006, formerly on television) (reactive as of April 28, 2008) (aired weekly) (TV-Y7-FV)
 Storm Hawks (debuted on Jetstream October 20, 2008) (aired weekly) (TV-Y7-FV) (Unlike the other shows, it didn't have a "Top 10" list.)
 Transformers: Animated (debuted on Jetstream February 15, 2008) (reactive as of October 27, 2008) (aired weekly) (TV-Y7-FV)

Series dropped from Toonami Jetstream
These shows have been taken off the schedule prematurely, possibly due to dubbing of the shows.
  Eyeshield 21  (debuted on Jetstream December 17, 2007) (TV-PG)
 The Prince of Tennis (debuted on Jetstream July 14, 2006, debuted on television December 23, 2006) (aired biweekly) Hiatus-December 3, 2007) (TV-PG)

These shows have been taken off the schedule prematurely, for reasons unknown:

 Dragon Ball (debuted on Jetstream July 2, 2007, formerly on television)

Finished/Inactive series
 Megas XLR (debuted on Jetstream July 14, 2006, formerly on television) (Inactive as of March 11, 2007) (aired weekly) (TV-Y7)
 Pokémon Chronicles (debuted on Jetstream October 9, 2006, on television at time of Jetstream debut) (Inactive as of April 15, 2007) (aired weekly) (TV-Y7 FV)
 Pokémon: Johto League Champions 1(debuted on Jetstream June 4, 2007, formerly on television) (inactive as of July 7, 2008) (aired weekly) (TV-Y7-FV)
 Pokémon: The Johto Journeys1 (started from the middle of the untitled second season, entitled Adventures in the Orange Islands on the DVDs) (debuted on Jetstream October 9, 2006, formerly on television) (inactive as of November 10, 2007) (aired weekly) (TV-Y7 FV)
 Star Wars: Clone Wars (debuted on Jetstream June 25, 2007, formerly on television) (inactive as of January 21, 2008) (aired weekly) (TV-Y7-FV)

Movies
 Naruto the Movie: Ninja Clash in the Land of Snow (TV-PG-V)
 Naruto the Movie 2: Legend of the Stone of Gelel (TV-PG-V)
 Naruto the Movie 3: Guardians of the Crescent Moon Kingdom (TV-PG-V)

Specials
 Pokémon (debuted on Jetstream January 14, 2007, formerly on television) (aired episode 55–57, the first three episodes that Todd appears, to commemorate the Virtual Console release  of Pokémon Snap for Nintendo 64) (TV-Y7-FV)
 Star Wars: The Clone Wars (debuted on Jetstream September 29, 2008) (A preview of Star Wars: The Clone Wars)

 Availability of each series 
Toonami Jetstream had five shows that originally could not be found anywhere else in their dubbed format. These shows were The Prince of Tennis, Eyeshield 21, MÄR, MegaMan Star Force, and Kiba. The first four were licensed by Viz Media and the last one by ADV Films, most of them for DVD releases. The fourth premiered on Toonami as an edited TV movie on August 25, 2007, and due to the online popularity of The Prince of Tennis and MÄR, they were added to the Toonami line-up on December 23, 2006, but Toonami Jetstream continued to show the world premiere English-language episodes, save for one MÄR episode that premiered on Toonami. However, as of June 2007, The Prince of Tennis and MÄR have been removed from the Toonami schedule, though a DVD release for them has begun. They were released on four 13-episode box sets and four 4-episode volumes respectively. MegaMan Star Force has not been seen on Toonami since its edited TV movie. It never had a DVD release. Only Eyeshield 21 has seen another release past 2010 in the United States, in four 13-episode subtitled-only DVD sets by Sentai Filmworks. However, all 145 episodes are available for streaming on Crunchyroll.

Premiere episodes of Naruto have been aired on TV, and previous episodes were available on thirty-two edited DVD volumes, and now available on eight uncut DVD sets by Viz Media. The subtitled uncut episodes are also streaming on Crunchyroll. The episodes on Toonami Jetstream were repeats.Dragon Ball Z, Samurai Jack, Star Wars: Clone Wars, Dragon Ball, Pokémon Chronicles, Megas XLR and Bobobo-bo Bo-bobo have already been aired completely on Cartoon Network. While Samurai Jack has only aired a small portion of its episodes on Toonami, it has been completely aired on Cartoon Network and all four seasons of the show are available on DVD and a complete series set with the fifth season on Blu-ray by Warner Home Video and Cartoon Network, later Adult Swim. All of Megas XLR has aired on Toonami, except for one episode which was skipped due to an error and later shown on Miguzi. It was never released on DVD. Star Wars: Clone Wars and Dragon Ball Z have completely aired on Toonami and are also available on Blu-ray and DVD by Warner Home Video and Funimation respectively. Dragon Ball has also finished airing on Toonami and is available on DVD by Funimation. Both of those shows are available for streaming on FunimationNOW, and Dragon Ball can be streamed for free. Pokémon Chronicles has finished airing on Toonami (except for one episode which aired on the normal Cartoon Network schedule), and Toonami Jetstream merely showed reruns starting from the first episode, but a DVD release only happened in Australia by Beyond Home Entertainment. Bobobo-bo Bo-bobo finished airing and 2 DVD volumes of four episodes each were available containing the first 8 episodes by Illumitoon Entertainment, but a third volume that was going to be released was cancelled due to the distributor, Westlake Entertainment's, closure. It was then licensed by S'more Entertainment for a complete series release on two 38-episode sets, but subtitles for the Japanese version weren't included. Discotek Media picked up the show and plans to release the entire show with subtitles on the Japanese version on SDBD soon. None of these anime mentioned in this paragraph are available for streaming on Crunchyroll as of 2018.Hikaru no Go was on ImaginAsian TV and was also available on DVD by Viz Media. It is currently unlicensed for any release as of 2018.Pokémon has aired five seasons. The first one was "The Johto Journeys" episodes previously aired on Kids' WB! (first run), Cartoon Network (reruns), and Toonami Jetstream (Reruns) are also available on DVD, but it actually started at the Orange League episode "The Pokémon Water War". They also aired "Johto League Champions" episodes that aired on Kids' WB! and are on DVD, but only a select few aired on Cartoon Network during the Pokémon master marathon. They have aired "Master Quest" episodes that aired on Kids' WB! (first run), on Cartoon Network's now-defunct Miguzi block (reruns), and are on DVD, as well as "Battle Frontier" episodes that aired on Cartoon Network's regular schedule (first run) with the first 14 having been rerun on Toonami. "Original Series" episodes aired previously on Kids' WB! (first run, though some aired in syndication first), Cartoon Network (reruns), and currently on Jetstream (also reruns). All DVDs currently released for those seasons are by The Pokémon Company International and distributed by Viz Media.One Piece aired reruns from Toonami, with the first 58 episodes having been aired on 4Kids TV prior to their Toonami premieres. It did not return to the site. 11 DVD volumes of the edited version were available from Viz Media, and it isn't available for legal streaming anymore in favor of Funimation's uncut dub that they started DVD releases for in 2008. The uncut version is currently streaming subbed on Crunchyroll and dubbed on FunimationNOW.Zatch Bell! originally aired on Toonami for 77 episodes, and is in the midst of a DVD release by Viz Media, however, it seemingly vanished from television after episode 77. Later, the show was added to Toonami Jetstream, and more recently, premiere English language episodes are being shown. It is currently being distributed by New Video.IGPX has already finished airing on Cartoon Network, with most of its run being on Toonami. It had uncut DVD volumes and edited DVD seasons by Bandai Entertainment from 2006 to 2007. In 2016, Discotek Media released the show on both edited and uncut forms on one DVD set, and is currently in print.

There has been no word on the fate of MegaMan NT Warrior (which had aired on Kids' WB! for most of its run), but it is presumably being skipped in favor of Star Force. Rumors are being spread that episodes of the Rockman EXE. Stream series will begin premiering on Jetstream. MegaMan NT Warrior was licensed by Viz Media.Transformers: Animated is currently airing episodes on TV, though not on Toonami, leaving Toonami Jetstream to air reruns. It has aired all of its current episodes of Toonami Jetstream, and was re-airing them. New episodes are now being aired on television. Its DVDs were distributed by Paramount Home Media Distribution and is currently being distributed by Shout! Factory.Blue Dragon aired Saturday mornings on Cartoon Network's regular schedule while Toonami Jetstream would air reruns, then it aired the world premiere English language episodes as of July 21, 2009, simultaneously with its premieres on Cartoon Network. It was licensed by Viz Media.Storm Hawks aired its complete first season on Cartoon Network, some on Toonami. However, season two has yet to come to the U.S., giving Jetstream the chance to air it, which they never did. It is currently being distributed by Sony Pictures Home Entertainment.

The first two movies to air on Jetstream were Naruto The Movie: Ninja Clash in the Land of Snow and Naruto the Movie 2: Legend of the Stone of GelelBobobo-bo Bo-bobo, Dragon Ball, Dragon Ball Z, and One Piece was seemingly removed from the site despite not being finished or due to dubbing issues.

 RSS feed 
Toonami Jetstream was offering two ways to check for updates. The first is a RSS feed on their website. Alternatively, a downloadable program called the Toonami Jetstream Desktop Receiver collected and displayed updates automatically, allowing easy access to new additions. After Toonami Jetstream became defunct, Cartoon Network Video made a desktop receiver of its own.

 Promotions with the Toonami Block 
The Toonami website began advertising the service on July 3, 2006. The first television promo was during Cartoon Planet on July 9, 2006. The first Toonami promo was on July 15, 2006, during a special Naruto'' marathon.

See also 
 Toonami
 Toonami - Online video services

External links
 Official website (Archive)

Toonami
Cartoon Network
Internet television channels
Internet properties established in 2006
Internet properties disestablished in 2009